Armenia competed in the Summer Olympic Games for the first time at the 1996 Summer Olympics in Atlanta, United States.  Previously, Armenian athletes competed for the Unified Team at the 1992 Summer Olympics.

Medalists

Athletics

Men
Field events

Boxing

Cycling

Road

Diving

Men

Women

Gymnastics

Judo

Shooting

Swimming

Women

Tennis

Weightlifting

Wrestling

Greco–Roman

Freestyle

See also 
Sports in Armenia

Notes

References
Official Olympic Reports
International Olympic Committee results database

1996 in Armenian sport
Nations at the 1996 Summer Olympics
1996